File Under So. Co., Waiting for... is a public art installation in Burlington, Vermont that is often erroneously called the world's tallest filing cabinet. It was built in 2002 by Bren Alvarez in response to years of delays building the Interstate 189 (Southern Connector) bypass into downtown Burlington. The filing cabinet is over 40 ft tall and was created by welding 38 individual filing cabinets together over a year, with a steel rod inside keeping it upright. Birds have been known to nest in the upper cabinets.

Relocation
In August 2020, due to the perceived imminence of construction in the area, it was decided to relocate the filing cabinet 100 ft from its previous position onto a new 10 ft pedestal. It is now located at 208 Flynn Avenue, Burlington.

File Herd: On the Road to Extinction
In 2020, an exhibition titled "File Herd: On the Road to Extinction" was showcased during the South End Art Hop in Burlington. Transformed filing cabinets were displayed around the original pedestal of File Under So. Co., Waiting for...

Similar installations
Untitled (Minuet in MG) is a similar structure in San Francisco that is 65 feet tall and contains the shredded parts of a 1974 MG Midget.

References

External links 

Buildings and structures in Burlington, Vermont
2002 establishments in Vermont
Tallest things